The German word Schwabacher (pronounced ) refers to a specific style of blackletter typefaces which evolved from Gothic Textualis (Textura) under the influence of Humanist type design in Italy during the 15th century. Schwabacher typesetting was the most common typeface in Germany, until it was replaced by Fraktur from the mid 16th century onwards.

Etymology
The term may derive from the Franconian town of Schwabach, where, in 1529, the Articles of Schwabach, a Lutheran creed, were adopted. The Articles became the basis of the 1530 Confessio Augustana, and possibly also promoted the use of Schwabacher types.

Characteristics

Similar to Rotunda, the rounded Schwabacher types were nearer to handwriting than the former Textualis style, though it also includes sharp edges. The lower-case g and upper-case H have particularly distinctive forms. In the context of German language texts, Schwabacher appeared vibrant and popular.

History
While the Latin Gutenberg Bible was still set in Textualis type, the oldest preserved Schwabacher incunable dates from 1472, and was printed in Augsburg. Schwabacher types appeared in the Free Imperial City of Nuremberg from about 1485: Anton Koberger (–1513) used them for the publication of the Nuremberg Chronicle (in both Latin and German) in 1493, and Albrecht Dürer (1471–1528) for his Apocalypse series in 1498. Schwabacher became widely known with the spread of Luther Bibles from 1522.

After Schwabacher was displaced by Fraktur as the most-used German language type style from about 1530, it remained in common use as a secondary typeface for emphasis in a similar way to italic. It was still used occasionally until the mid 20th century.

Normal type decree 
When the Nazis officially abandoned the widely used Fraktur type by Martin Bormann's  of 3 January 1941, it was called  ("Jew-letters of Schwabach"):

The statement ignores the fact that Schwabacher originated from the earlier Rotunda blackletter script and late medieval Bastarda types. Actually, there is no evidence of any connection between Jews and the Schwabacher typeface. At the time of its origin the ownership of printing houses was reserved for Christian citizens.

Samples

The German sentence in this sample reads: " [Example of Old Schwabacher]: ". This is a nonsense sentence meaning "Victor chases twelve boxers across the dike of Sylt", but contains all 26 letters of the alphabet plus the German umlauts and is thus an example of a pangram.

Notes and references

Further reading
 Friedrich Beck: „Schwabacher Judenlettern“ - Schriftverruf im Dritten Reich. in: Die Kunst des Vernetzens, Verlag für Berlin-Brandenburg, 2006,  (pdf)
 Philipp Luidl: Die Schwabacher – Die ungewöhnlichen Wege der Schwabacher Judenletter. Maro Verlag, Augsburg 2004. 
 "Vergessen und verdrängt" Schwabach 1918-1945, Ausstellungskatalog Stadtmuseum Schwabach, p. 172

External links

Blackletter
Blackletter typefaces
German orthography